is a computer scientist working at the Nihon University in Tokyo. Toda earned his Ph.D. from the Tokyo Institute of Technology in 1992, under the supervision of Kojiro Kobayashi. He was a recipient of the 1998 Gödel Prize for proving Toda's theorem in computational complexity theory, which states that every problem in the polynomial hierarchy has a polynomial-time Turing reduction to a counting problem.

Notes

Japanese computer scientists
20th-century Japanese mathematicians
21st-century Japanese mathematicians
Theoretical computer scientists
Gödel Prize laureates
1959 births
Living people
Academic staff of Nihon University